The 1998–99 Asian Club Championship was the 18th edition of the annual international club football competition held in the AFC region (Asia). It determined that year's club champion of association football in Asia.

Júbilo Iwata of Japan won the final and became Asian champions for the first time.

First round

West Asia

|}
Bye: Esteghlal (Iran).

1 Both legs were played in Baghdad, Iraq by mutual agreement. 
2 FC Irtysh were ejected from the competition for using two ineligible players. 
3 FK Neftchy Farg'ona withdrew.

East Asia

|}

1 Selangor FA were entered after Penang, who had beaten them for the championship, withdrew due to excessive travel costs. 
2 BEC Tero Sasana finished fourth, but were entered after the three clubs who finished above them for the championship withdrew due to excessive travel costs. 
3 The match was played over one leg by mutual agreement. 
4 Allied Bank Limited FC withdrew. 
5 Finance and Revenue were drawn against the representatives of Indonesia, where the 1997/98 season was abandoned and the championship withheld due to political and economic turmoil in the country.

Second round

West Asia

|}

East Asia

|}

1 The match was played over one leg by mutual agreement.

Quarterfinals

West Asia

East Asia

Semifinals

Third place match

Final

Awards

References

Asian Club Competitions 1999 at RSSSF.com

1998 in Asian football
1999 in Asian football
1998-99